Nicolas Mahut was the defending champion, but lost in the quarterfinals to Roberto Bautista Agut. 
Bautista Agut went on to win the title, defeating Benjamin Becker in the final, 2–6, 7–6(7–2), 6–4.

Seeds

Draw

Finals

Top half

Bottom half

Qualifying

Seeds

Qualifiers

Lucky loser
  Paolo Lorenzi

Qualifying draw

First qualifier

Second qualifier

Third qualifier

Fourth qualifier

References
 Main Draw
 Qualifying Draw

Topshelf Openandnbsp;- Singles
2014 Men's Singles